"Take My Love" may refer to:

Take My Love, a 1980 album from Nancy Wilson discography 
"Take My Love", a song by Frank Sinatra
Take My Love, an album by Russian musical group Plazma
"Take My Love", a song by Russian musical group Plazma from the eponymous album
"Take My Love", a song by Swedish band Krokus from their album Hellraiser.